Gavthi is a 2018 Indian Marathi-language  drama film directed by Anand Kumar Konnar. The film stars Shrikant Patil, Yogita Chavan, Nagesh Bhosale in the lead roles. The film was released on 30 March 2018.

Cast 

 Shrikant Patil as Gajanan aka Gajya
 Yogita Chavan as Gauri
 Nagesh Bhosale  as Gauri's father
 Vandana Waknis
 Gaurav More
 Kishor Kadam as Gajanan's father
 Kushal Badrike
 Kishor Chougule
 Ankur Wadhave
 Pankaj Vishnu
 Sadanand Yadav

References

External links 

 

2018 films
2018 comedy-drama films
Indian comedy-drama films
2010s Marathi-language films